The Rumor III Cabinet was the 25th cabinet of the Italian Republic.

Party breakdown
 Christian Democracy (DC): prime minister, 16 ministers, 33 undersecretaries
 Italian Socialist Party (PSI): deputy prime minister, 5 ministers, 13 undersecretaries
 Italian Democratic Socialist Party (PSDI): 3 ministers, 8 undersecretaries
 Italian Republican Party (PRI): 1 minister, 2 undersecretaries

Composition

|}

References

Italian governments
1970 establishments in Italy
1970 disestablishments in Italy
Cabinets established in 1970
Cabinets disestablished in 1970